The Golden Bell Award for Best Theme Song is one of the categories of the competition for Taiwanese television production, Golden Bell Awards. It was introduced in 2022.

Winners

2020s

References

Theme Song, Best
Golden Bell Awards, Best Theme Song